Waki is a small town and commune in the Cercle of San in the Ségou Region of Mali. As of 1998 the commune had a population of 6,167.

References

It is also mentioned in nates blog.

Communes of Ségou Region